Triumph is a gospel album by singer Philip Bailey, released in 1986 by Word Records. The album reached No. 18 on the Billboard Top Christian Albums chart and No. 33 on the Billboard Top Gospel Albums chart. Triumph also won a Grammy in the category of Best Male Gospel Performance.

Track listing
 "All Soldiers" (Keithen Carter, Patrick Leonard) – 4:47
 "Thank You" (Bobby Nunn) – 3:40
 "The Love of God" (Oliver W. Wells) – 3:12
 "Marvelous" (George Duke, Philip Bailey) – 4:27
 "The Same Way (You've Always Been)" (Lionel Butts) – 4:32
 "The Other Side" (Keithen Carter, Patrick Leonard) – 4:45
 "Bring It To Jesus" (Bob Bailey, Dheric Lee, Raymond Brown) – 5:38
 "Triumph" (Jerry Peters) – 4:55
 "Come Before His Presence" (Margaurite Ingram) – 4:31

Credits

Musicians 
 Philip Bailey – lead vocals, vocal arrangements, percussion (1, 3, 5-9) 
 Robbie Buchanan – keyboards (1, 2, 3, 5-9), instruments (9), arrangements (9)
 Greg Phillinganes – keyboards (1, 2, 3, 5-9)
 Bobby Nunn – keyboards (2)
 George Duke – all instruments (4), arrangements (4)
 Paul Jackson Jr. – guitars (1, 2, 3, 5-9)
 Kevin Chokan – guitars (2)
 David Williams – guitars (3, 5, 8)
 Jerry Peters – guitars (3, 5, 7, 8)
 "Ready" Freddie Washington – bass (1, 3, 5)
 Byron Miller – bass (5, 6, 7)
 Paulinho da Costa – percussion (1, 3, 5-9)
 Andrew Woolfolk – horns (7)
 Carl Carwell – backing vocals 
 Lynn Davis – backing vocals 
 Winston Ford – backing vocals 
 Kathy Hazzard – backing vocals
 Josie James – backing vocals

Production 
 Producers – Philip Bailey (all tracks); George Duke (track 4); Jerry Peters (track 8)
 Engineers – Ed Cherney (tracks 1, 3, 5–9); Phil Walters (track 2); Erik Zobler (track 4)
 Recorded at The Complex Studios (Los Angeles, CA), Cherokee Studios (Hollywood, California), LeGonksWest (West Hollywood, California) and Buckman Studios (Los Angeles, California).
 Art direction – Chuck Beeson 
 Photography – Bonnie Schiffman 
 Graphic design – Donald Krieger

Charts

References

1986 albums
Philip Bailey albums
Word Records albums
Albums produced by Philip Bailey